In the beliefs of the Nation of Islam (NOI), Yakub (sometimes spelled Yacub or Yaqub) was a black scientist who lived 6,600 years ago and began the creation of the white race. He is said to have done this through a form of selective breeding which is referred to as "grafting", while he was living on the island of Patmos. The Nation of Islam's theology states that Yakub is the biblical Jacob. 

The story has caused disputes within the NOI during its history. Under its current leader Louis Farrakhan, the NOI continues to assert that the story of Yakub is true, claiming that modern science is consistent with it. Despite the NOI's self-proclamations of consistency with modern science, there are no reputable scientific studies that support this assertion.

Story
The story of Yakub originated in the writings of Wallace Fard Muhammad, the founder of the Nation of Islam, in his doctrinal Q&A pamphlet Lost Found Moslem Lesson No. 2. It was developed by his successor Elijah Muhammad in several writings, most fully in a chapter entitled "The Making of Devil" in his book Message to the Blackman in America.

Yakub is said to have been born in Mecca at a time when 30% of original black people were "dissatisfied". He was a member of the Meccan branch of the Tribe of Shabazz. Yakub acquired the nickname "big head", because of his unusually large head and his arrogance. At the age of six, he discovered the law of attraction and repulsion by playing with magnets made of steel. 

This insight led to a plan to create new people. He "saw an unlike human being, made to attract others, who could, with the knowledge of tricks and lies, rule the original black man.” By the age of 18, he had exhausted all knowledge in the universities of Mecca. He then discovered that the original black man contained both a "black germ" and a "brown germ". With 59,999 followers, he went to an "isle in the Aegean Sea called Pelan", which Muhammad identifies with Patmos. Once there, he established a despotic regime and set about breeding out the black traits, killed all darker babies, and created a brown race after 200 years.

Yakub died at the age of 150, but his followers carried on his work. After 600 years of this deliberate eugenics, the white race was created. The brutal conditions of their creation determined the evil nature of the new race: "by lying to the black mother of the baby, this lie was born into the very nature of the white baby; and, murder for the black people was also born in them—or made by nature a liar and murderer".

The new race traveled to Mecca where they caused so much trouble they were exiled to "West Asia (Europe), and stripped of everything but the language....Once there, they were roped in, to keep them out of Paradise....The soldiers patrolled the border armed with swords, to prevent the devils from crossing." For many centuries they lived a barbaric life, surviving naked in caves and eating raw meat, but eventually they were drawn out of the caves by Moses who "taught them to wear clothes". Moses tried to civilize them, but eventually gave up and blew up 300 of the most troublesome of them with dynamite. 

However, they had learned to use "tricknology": a plan to use their lack of empathy, emotion, and trickery to usurp power and enslave the black population, bringing the first slaves to America. According to The Autobiography of Malcolm X, all the races other than the black race were by-products of Yakub's (spelled Yacub in the biography) work, as the "red, yellow and brown" races were created during the "bleaching" process; however, the "black race" included Asian peoples, considered to be shared ancestors of the Moors.

"Whites" were defined as Europeans. Elijah Muhammad also asserted that some of the new white race "tried to graft themselves back into the black nation, but they had nothing to go by." As a result, they became gorillas. "A few were lucky enough to make a start, and got as far as what you call the gorilla. In fact, all of the monkey family are from this 2,000 year history of the white race in Europe."

According to NOI doctrine, Yakub's progeny were destined to rule for 6,000 years before the original black peoples of the world regained dominance, a process that had begun in 1914.

Yakub and Jacob
Fard Muhammad's Yakub has some parallels to the Biblical Jacob's role as the father of the tribes of Israel. The idea that Jews were an "artificial race" created by interbreeding and dependent on "tricks and lies" already existed in antisemitic theories of the time. The story of Yakub includes Jews as part of a wider artificially created "white" race.

In speeches by Malcolm X, Yakub is identified completely with Jacob. Referring to the story of Jacob wrestling with the angel, Malcolm X states that Elijah Muhammad told him that "Jacob was Yacub, and the angel that Jacob wrestled with wasn't God, it was the government of the day". This was because Yakub was seeking funds for his expedition to Patmos, "so when it says Jacob wrestled with an angel, 'angel' is only used as a symbol to hide the one he was really wrestling with". However, Malcolm X also states that John of Patmos was also Yakub, and that the Book of Revelation refers to his deeds: "John was Yacub. John was out there getting ready to make a new race, he said, for the word of the Lord".

Sources

Ernest Allen argues that "the Yakub myth may have been created out of whole cloth by Prophet Fard". Allen says the Yakub story could conceivably have been influenced by a real historical event during the struggle between Muslims and Christians for control of Spain. Muslim leader Abu Yusuf Yaqub al-Mansur defeated the Franks at the Battle of Alarcos (1195). After the battle 40,000 European prisoners of war were taken to Morocco to labor on Yaqub's building projects. They were then set free and "allowed to form a valley settlement located somewhere between Fez and Marrakesh. On his deathbed Ya'qub lamented his decision to allow these Shibanis (as they came to be called) to form an enclave on Moroccan soil, thereby posing a potential threat to the stability of the Moorish empire."

Yusuf Nuruddin says that a more direct source was the doctrine of the "Yacobites" propounded by Timothy Drew's Moorish Science Temple, to which Fard had probably belonged before he founded the NOI. According to Drew, early pre-Columbian civilizations were founded by a West African Moor "named Yakub who landed on the Yucatan peninsula". This derived from the then-current notion that the gigantic heads created by the ancient Olmec peoples of the Yucatán area had "negroid" features (see Olmec alternative origin speculations), which had led Leo Wiener to argue that they were from West Africa.

They [Drew's followers] said that the huge stone heads attested to the fact that the Yakubites evolved into a race of scientific geniuses with large heads (as depicted in the sculptures) and small bodies. This legend of Yakub—a bigheaded scientist—finds its way into the mythology of the Nation of Islam, indicating that the founders of the NOI, W. D. Farrad and Elijah Muhammad, were influenced by the Moorish Science Temple, and were possibly even members.

Harold Bloom in his book The American Religion argues that Yakub combines elements of the biblical God and the Gnostic concept of the Demiurge, saying that "Yakub has an irksome memorability as a crude but pungent Gnostic Demiurge". Nathaniel Deutsch also notes that Fard and Muhammad draw on the concept of the Demiurge, along with traditions of esotericism in Biblical interpretation, absorbing aspects of Biblical tales to the new narrative, such as the swords of the Muslim warriors keeping the "white devils" from Paradise, like the flaming sword of the angel protecting the Garden of Eden in Genesis. 

Edward Curtis calls the story "a black theodicy: a story grounded in a mythological view of history that explained the fall of black civilization, the Middle Passage from Africa to the Americas, and the practice of Christian religion among slaves and their descendants."

Several commentators state that the story, by associating blacks with ancient high civilizations and whites with cave-dwelling barbarians and gorillas, both uses and spectacularly reverses the populist and scientific racism of the era which identified Africans as primitive, or closer to apes than whites. This drew on earlier criticisms of white supremacist Nordicism, creating a mythic version of "attacks on AngloSaxon lineage and behavior that had been voiced by more mainstream black thinkers during the nineteenth century....With these references the [NOI] Muslims replicated the images of European savagery in the Middle Ages that were so pervasive in nineteenth-century black racial thought."  Deutsch says that "Muhammad anchored his radical doctrine within the context of an established scriptural tradition" of Biblical exegesis, which "was therefore a sophisticated form of racism against whites."

Role in the Nation of Islam
The doctrine of Yakub was one of the reasons for splits in the Nation of Islam. Malcolm X in his Autobiography notes that, in his travels in the Middle East, many Muslims reacted with shock upon hearing about the doctrine of Yakub, which, while present in NOI theology, does not appear in mainstream Islam.  He rejected the story in his later statements, asserting that anyone of any race who intentionally deprives others of basic human rights is a "devil". Warith Deen Mohammed, who took over the Nation of Islam after his father Elijah's death rejected it almost immediately, and tried to re-invent the Nation as a mainstream Sunni Islam movement.

Louis Farrakhan reinstated the original Nation of Islam, and has reasserted his belief in the literal truth of the story of Yakub. In a 1996 interview, Henry Louis Gates, Chairman of Harvard University's Afro-American Studies Department, asked him whether the story was a metaphor or literal. Farrakhan claimed that aspects of the story had been proven accurate by modern genetic science and insisted that "Personally, I believe that Yakub is not a mythical figure—he is a very real scientist. Not a big-head silly thing, as they would like to say." 

Farrakhan's periodical The Final Call continues to publish articles arguing that modern science supports the accuracy of Elijah Muhammad's account of Yakub. The NOI splinter groups the Five-Percent Nation and the United Nation of Islam also believe in the Yakub doctrine.

In culture

Drama
The American author and playwright Amiri Baraka's play A Black Mass (1965) takes inspiration from the story of Yakub. According to critic Melani McAlister, "the character of Yakub, now called Jacoub, is introduced as one of three 'Black Magicians' who together symbolize the black origin of all religions." McAlister argues that, Baraka turns the Nation's myth into a reinterpretation of the Faust story and a simultaneous meditation on the role and function of art. As with Faust, Jacoub's individualism and egotism are his undoing, but his failings also signal the destruction of a community. Baraka's version of the story also draws on the Frankenstein tale; he conflates the six hundred years of Elijah Muhammad's “history” into a single, terrible moment of the creation of a monster. In Baraka's version the experiment creates a single Frankenstein-like "white" monster who kills Jacoub and the other magician-scientists and bites a woman, transforming her in a vampire-like way into a white-devil mate for himself. From this monstrous couple the white race is descended.

Rap
According to Charise L. Cheney, the doctrine of Yakub has had a significant influence in rap culture, referring to raps by Kam and Grand Puba.

This pseudoscientific theory of racial formation was embraced by rap nationalists like former Ice Cube protégé Kam in his 1995 song “Keep tha Peace.” A self-proclaimed member of the Nation, Kam presented organizational doctrine as a way to explain the roots of black-on-black crime and gang violence in America's inner cities: “I'm really not knowin' who to blame or fault / for this tension / I mention this gump / Yakub's cavey / the blue-eyed punk / playin' both sides against each other / now that's the real mutha[fucka].”... In 1990 Grand Puba of Brand Nubian announced that his calling was to bring enlightenment to black people and an end to white domination. ... "Here comes the god to send the devil right back to his cave.… We're gonna drop the bomb on the Yakub crew."

Chuck D of Public Enemy also refers to the story in his song "Party for Your Right to Fight", referring to the Yakub story by attributing the deaths of African American radicals to the “grafted devils” conspiring against the “Black Asiatic Man.”

Method Man of the Wu-Tang Clan references the story of Yakub in the Ol' Dirty Bastard's song "Raw Hide," saying: "A mystery god that's the work of Yacub / The Holy Ghost got you scared to death kid boo!". In the Wu-Tang Clan's song "Gravel Pit", at the end of it, can be heard a vocal sample from a 1977 movie Short Eyes which says about Yakub: "Yakub, maker and creator of the devil. Swine merchant... your time is near at hand. Fuck with me and your time will be now. Your presence here affects the mind of my people like a fever. You, Yakub, are the bearer of 9,999 diseases, evil, corrupt, porkchop-eatin' brain!".

Wu-Tang member Ghostface Killah also references the story of Yakub in his song "One" from his album Supreme Clientele. He raps: "A-yo, the Devil planted fear inside the black babies." He concludes the verse with: "Dead meat placed on the shelves, we eat cold cuts / Fast from the hog y'all and grow up," advocating the NOI's dietary practice of avoiding pork.

Nas raps "You devils will run back into the caves you came from" in his song "Message to the Feds, Sincerely, We the People" from his album Street's Disciple.

On a freestyle to Drake's song "We Made It", Jay Electronica says "All these devils, I got to strike some" and Jay-Z says "I'm ready to chase the Yakub back into caves". Jay Electronica also referenced Yakub on Kanye West's 2021 song "Jesus Lord" from his album Donda, with the line "I could change the world like Yakub with two pieces of steel".

Media
Comedy hosts Desus & Mero frequently declare the outlandish actions or desires of certain white people as "Yakubian."

References

External links
Kambiz GhaneaBassiri, Competing visions of Islam in the United States: a study of Los Angeles, Greenwood Publishing Group, 1997, pp. 146ff.

Antisemitic canards
Anti-white racism in the United States
Jacob
National mysticism
Nation of Islam
Patmos
Pseudohistory
Scientific racism